Cayley Illingworth FRS  (11 April 1759, in Nottingham – 23 August 1823, in Scampton) was Archdeacon of Stow from 1808 until his death.

Illingworth was educated at Pembroke College, Cambridge  and ordained in 1782. He held livings at Barrow upon Humber, Epworth and Scampton. He received the degree of Doctor of Divinity (DD).

Notes

1759 births
18th-century English Anglican priests
19th-century English Anglican priests
Alumni of Pembroke College, Cambridge
Archdeacons of Stow
1823 deaths
People from Nottingham
Fellows of the Royal Society